Bai (Belanda, Biri, BGamba, Gumba, Mbegumba, Mvegumba) is a Ubangian language of South Sudan.

As of 2013, ethnic Bai reside in Khorgana Boma, Beselia Payam, Wau County.

References

Languages of South Sudan
Sere languages